The Miami–Nebraska football rivalry is an American college football rivalry between the Miami Hurricanes of the University of Miami and Nebraska Cornhuskers of the University of Nebraska–Lincoln. Both teams have most often met in bowl games which many times have decided a national championship. The series is currently tied 6–6.

History
The inaugural matchup between the Cornhuskers and Hurricanes was in 1951 in Miami, Florida. The Hurricanes won 19–7. The next game was in 1953 in Lincoln, Nebraska with the Cornhuskers winning 20–16. 

In Nebraska's first ever bowl victory and first bowl game under head coach Bob Devaney, the Huskers beat Miami 36–34 in the Gotham Bowl on December 15, 1962. The Cornhuskers would also beat Miami two more times during the regular season in 1975 and 1976.

The Hurricanes faced the Cornhuskers again in the 1984 Orange Bowl, which would decide the 1983 national champion. Near the end of the game with a 31–30 deficit and little time left, Nebraska coach Tom Osborne decided to go for the win with a two-point conversion and failed, giving Miami the win and the national title. Miami would beat Nebraska again in the 1989 and 1992 Orange Bowls. The latter would result in Miami receiving the AP National Championship for the 1991 season.

In the 1995 Orange Bowl, #1 Nebraska beat #3 Miami 24–17 to win its first consensus national title since 1971.

The last meeting in a bowl game was in the 2002 Rose Bowl, which was also the BCS National Championship Game. Miami blew out Nebraska 37–14 to win the national title.

The Cornhuskers and Hurricanes scheduled a back-to-back matchup for the 2014 and 2015 seasons. Nebraska won the first game 41–31 at Memorial Stadium in Lincoln, NE before the largest crowd to ever fill Memorial Stadium. The 2015 game was the first game since 1962 where both teams have not held a pre-game ranking in the AP poll. It was also the first time the Cornhuskers traveled to the state of Florida for a regular season game since the original contest against Miami in 1951. Nebraska came back from a 33–10 4th quarter deficit to force overtime. Miami won it in overtime with a field goal, 36–33.

Game results

See also  
 List of NCAA college football rivalry games

References

College football rivalries in the United States
Miami Hurricanes football
Nebraska Cornhuskers football